William W. Beach is the Commissioner of Labor Statistics and head of the U.S. Bureau of Labor Statistics (BLS), an independent U.S. government fact-finding agency focused on labor economics and statistics, inflation, and productivity.

Beach was nominated for the position in October 2017 and confirmed by the U.S. Senate on March 13, 2019.

Education 
Beach holds a BA degree from Washburn University, a master's degree from the University of Missouri in Columbia, Missouri and a PhD in economics from the University of Buckingham.

Career 

Beach was previously Vice President for Policy Research at the Mercatus Center of George Mason University, Chief Economist for the Senate Budget Committee, Republican Staff, and Lazof Family Fellow in Economics at The Heritage Foundation and director of the Foundation's Center for Data Analysis.

Selected works
 Beach, William W., and Tim Kane. "Methodology: Measuring the 10 economic freedoms." 2008 Index of economic freedom (2008): 39–55.
 Beach, William W., and Marc A. Miles. "Explaining the factors of the index of economic freedom." 2006 Index of Economic Freedom (2006): 55–76.
 Beach, William W., and Gareth G. Davis. Social Security's rate of return. Heritage Foundation, 1998.
 Beach, William W., Aaron B. Schavey, and Isabel M. Isidro. How Realiable are IMF Economic Forecasts?. Heritage Foundation, 1999.
 Butler, Stuart M., William W. Beach, and Paul L. Winfree. Pathways to economic mobility: Key indicators. Economic mobility project, 2008.

References

External links

21st-century American economists
Bureau of Labor Statistics
United States Department of Labor officials
Trump administration personnel
American civil servants
Washburn University alumni
Alumni of the University of Buckingham
University of Missouri alumni
Living people
Year of birth missing (living people)